The Bantamweight competition at the 2013 AIBA World Boxing Championships was held from 17–26 October 2013. Boxers were limited to a maximum of 56 kilograms in body mass.

Medalists

Seeds

  Robeisy Ramírez (quarterfinals)
  Michael Conlan (quarterfinals)
  Robenílson Vieira (third round)
  Shiva Thapa (quarterfinals)
  Nyambayaryn Tögstsogt (second round)
  Mykola Butsenko (semifinals)
  Veaceslav Gojan (third round)
  Kairat Yeraliyev (semifinals)
  Omurbek Malabekov (third round)
  Vladimir Nikitin (final)

Draw

Finals

Top half

Section 1

Section 2

Bottom half

Section 3

Section 4

References
Draw

2013 AIBA World Boxing Championships